Lesce-Bled railway station is a railway station in the town of Lesce in the Upper Carniola region of northwestern Slovenia. It also serves the nearby town of Bled about 4 km away.  It is operated by Slovenian Railways (SŽ).

Description
Lesce-Bled station is situated on the Tarvisio–Ljubljana Railway which opened in 1870, although the section of line between Jesenice and Tarvisio closed in the 1960s.  It is served by regional trains between Ljubljana and Jesenice, as well as international trains between Zagreb Glavni kolodvor and (via the Karawanks Tunnel) Villach Hauptbahnhof, many of which continue to Salzburg Hauptbahnhof, Munich Hauptbahnhof and Frankfurt Hauptbahnhof.

External links

Railway stations in Slovenia